The Jewish Learning Network or JNET is an adult education program run by the Chabad-Lubavitch movement. It is a division of the Chabad movement's educational arm, Merkos L'Inyonei Chinuch.

Founding
"JNet" is a non-profit organization acting under Merkos L'Inyonei Chinuch, the central educational organization of the Chabad-Lubavitch movement. JNet was founded in November, 2005 as an adult education resource. The program matches registrants with volunteers based on the registrant's study request. Registrants often have little Jewish education, while volunteers are often Chabad-raised and schooled.

Director
The organization's director was Rabbi Yehuda Dukes. Dukes died on January 22, 2021, from complications due to COVID-19.

References

External links
Jnet website

Chabad organizations
Jewish organizations established in 2005
Education in North America
Adult education
Chabad-Lubavitch (Hasidic dynasty)